Iranamadu Airport is an air force station and domestic airport in Iranamadu in northern Sri Lanka. Originally built by the rebel Liberation Tigers of Tamil Eelam in 2003, it was captured by the Sri Lankan military in 2009 and taken over by the Sri Lanka Air Force.

History
The rebel Liberation Tigers of Tamil Eelam first built an airstrip in Iranamadu in the early 1990s. In 1993 they started clearing land south east of the Iranamadu Tank and over the next two years constructed a runway which was opened by LTTE leader V. Prabhakaran on 19 March 1995. The runway was then bombed and destroyed by the Sri Lanka Air Force. In late 2003, during the Norwegian facilitated ceasefire, the LTTE started clearing land at another site, east of Iranamadu Tank. Within a year the LTTE had built a  runway. The air force bombed the airstrip several times, indulging in June 2006 after the Kebithigollewa massacre. The airstrip was the launchpad for a number of Air Tigers attacks including the raid on Anuradhapura Air Force Base in October 2007. The Sri Lankan military captured the airstrip on 15 January 2009.

A Sri Lanka Air Force detachment moved onto the site on 21 June 2009. The airstrip became an air station on 3 August 2011. The airstrip was reconstructed in 2011 and opened for light aircraft. The airstrip was then converted into an airport with a  runway capable of handling the air force's Lockheed C-130 Hercules and Antonov An-32 aircraft. The new airport was officially opened by President Mahinda Rajapaksa, becoming the country's 16th domestic airport.

Airlines and destinations

References

External links
 Sri Lanka Air Force Station Iranamadu

2003 establishments in Sri Lanka
Airports in Sri Lanka
Military installations in Northern Province, Sri Lanka
Sri Lanka Air Force bases
Transport buildings and structures in Mullaitivu District